Yavneh Olami was an international Religious Zionist student organization that worked to inspire and educate Jewish students from the Diaspora to strengthen their connection to Israel and the Jewish People. The organization, affiliated with World Mizrachi, ran educational programs that focused on pro-Israel advocacy, Israel connectivity, leadership development, and encouraging Jewish students to make Israel their home.

Yavneh Olami was headquartered in Jerusalem with offices in New York City and Toronto and an expanding volunteer network in the United Kingdom, Australia and South Africa. The organization often worked in partnership with Israeli governmental agencies and nonprofit organizations in Israel and abroad in order to meet the needs of religious Zionist students worldwide.

As of 2014, Enterprise Israel (formerly Yavneh Summer Internship Program) has been run by the World Mizrachi Movement.

See also
 Israel
 Mizrachi (Religious Zionism)
 Religious Zionist Movement
 Zionism

Religious Zionism